Lake Bluff is a village in Lake County, Illinois, United States. Per the 2020 census, the population was 5,616.

History
The first settler family to claim land within the area now part of Lake Bluff arrived in 1836. They claimed 100 acres of land extending from the lake west to the Green Bay Trail. In 1849, a few residents left to seek their fortune in the California gold rush. In 1837, William and Mary Dwyer claimed the land just north of the former Central School.  They opened and operated a stage coach stop and tavern along the Green Bay Trail.  Some of the other early settlers were Henry and Angeline Ostrander, James Cole and William Whitnell.

In 1855, the first railroad through Lake County was completed, running from Chicago through the county line.  Henry Ostrander owned the land where the depot was to be placed, and he agreed to donate the site if the depot were called "Rockland."  Therefore, this area, known previously as the Dwyer Settlement and Oak Hill, became Rockland, the only stop between Highland Park and Waukegan.  Rockland had a post office and general store on Mawman Avenue with a small school and church located west of the tracks near Green Bay Road.

In 1875, a group of Methodist ministers led by Solomon Thatcher of River Forest purchased 100 acres of lakefront property from Ben Cloes, the youngest son of the first settlers. 
The Lake Bluff Camp Meeting Association was formed and Rockland was renamed "Lake Bluff."  The Association planned a resort that would provide not only religious activities but also social, cultural, educational and recreational programs. From the beginning, the Camp Meeting was successful at bringing in well-known personalities of the time, such as Frances Willard and Mrs. Rutherford B. Hayes.  Summer visitors were attracted to Lake Bluff to enjoy the beach and ravines and participate in the Camp Meeting activities.  A 10-acre lake in the center of town, Artesian Lake, provided additional recreational opportunities. Lake Bluff was a summer colony at the time, as most residents were seasonal.

Land was divided into 25-foot lots on which a cottage "could be erected within 20 days of purchase for $250."  The first hotel, the Bluff Lodge, was opened in 1876. By the mid 1880s there were more than 30 hotels and boarding houses and a large tabernacle with seating for more than 2,000 people.

Lake Bluff incorporated as a village in 1895. Charles Trusdell, the first Village President, built his home at 115 East Center Avenue.  The East School opened in September 1895. In 1904, the railroad station was erected, and in 1905 the present Village Hall was built.

During the First World War, Lake Bluff was proclaimed the "most patriotic small town in America" for the efforts of the residents in supporting the Red Cross and purchasing an ambulance to send to France.

In the 1920s, Lake Bluff made plans to join the other North Shore suburbs in the race to attract new homes and growing families. New brick stores were added in the business block, and a large addition to East School was constructed. However, 1929 brought the Great Depression, and the plans for expansion never materialized.

Geography

Lake Bluff is located in the North Shore area at  (42.281, -87.849).

It is bordered by Lake Michigan on the east, Naval Station Great Lakes to the north, Lake Forest to the south, and Libertyville to the west. The town is named for the prominent bluff overlooking Lake Michigan that extends across the eastern boundary.

Half of Lake Bluff's land area is residential in nature, while the rest is mainly devoted to parks and recreation. Major parks include Blair Park, Ravine Park, Sunrise Park, and Artesian Park.

Demographics

2020 census

Note: the US Census treats Hispanic/Latino as an ethnic category. This table excludes Latinos from the racial categories and assigns them to a separate category. Hispanics/Latinos can be of any race.

2010 Census
As of the 2010 US census, there were 5,722 people, 1,992 households, and 1,743 families residing in the village. There were 2,178 housing units at an average density of 542.5 units per square mile (209.4/km). The racial makeup of the village was 92.05% White, 0.58% African American, 0.10% Native American, 5.54% Asian, 1.29% Hispanic or Latino, 0% Pacific Islander, 0.44% from other races, and 1.29% from two or more races.

As of 2010, there were 2,178 households, out of which 42.5% had children under the age of 18 living with them, 80.6% were married couples living together, 6.3% had a female householder with no husband present, and 12.1% were non-families. 10.2% of all households were made up of individuals living alone, and 6.5% had someone living alone who was 65 years of age or older. The average household size was 2.86 and the average family size was 3.21.

In the village, 29.3% of the population was under the age of 18, 5.5% were from 18 to 24, 15.6% from 25 to 44, 27.4% from 45 to 64, and 14.7% were 65 years of age or older. The median age was 44.8 years. For every 100 females, there were 92.5 males. For every 100 females ages 18 and over, there were 90.4 males.

The median household income was $114,521, and the median income for a family was $124,674. Males had a median income of $92,233 versus $50,352 for females. The per capita income for the village was $54,824.  About 0.7% of families and 1.1% of the population were below the poverty line, including 0.6% of those under the age of 18 and 0.0% ages 65 or older.

Transportation

Road
U.S. Route 41 passes through the western portion of the village, and directly west of Lake Bluff is Interstate 94, both highways providing access for commuters to Chicago or Milwaukee.

During the summer of 2010, a wild turkey began to inhabit the corner of Green Bay Road and Route 176, capturing the hearts of the local residents and inspiring a book called The Town Turkey. The following year, another wild turkey was spotted on Route 176.

Scranton Avenue runs through the central business district and functions as a "Main Street" of sorts. The local police station, fire department, and the Village Hall are located on East Center Avenue. Both roads run from the center of town to the lake.

Rail

Until its bankruptcy in 1962, the Chicago North Shore and Milwaukee electric interurban railroad between Chicago's "Loop" and Milwaukee had a stop in Lake Bluff.  As of 2018, the Union Pacific Railroad (formerly the Chicago & North Western Railway and later the Chicago and North Western Transportation Company) still runs through Lake Bluff. This line, part of Chicago's Metra commuter rail agency, provides access to Chicago through Ogilvie Station and to Kenosha, Wisconsin (but no longer to Racine and Milwaukee as did the Milwaukee Division of the "Northwestern" in earlier times).

Although not a passenger rail line, the Elgin, Joliet and Eastern Railway "Outer Belt Line" also has trackage in Lake Bluff.

Education

Lake Bluff East Elementary School, originally known as "Lake Bluff School", was the first school in Lake Bluff. In 1963, Lake Bluff West Elementary School was built for children living in west Lake Bluff (unincorporated Knollwood). In 1967, Lake Bluff Central Elementary School was constructed for students in north Lake Bluff. In the 1970s, West School was shut down, and held many other titles, and the whole system moved from geographic centers to grade/specific attendance centers. In April 2007, a referendum passed by only 22 votes to build a new school. In a land swap with the park district, District 65 acquired land adjacent to the old Central School and gave up land adjacent to the old West School. West School was sold in May 2007 for approximately 1 million dollars, which was also the minimum bid for the property. The new Lake Bluff Elementary School (grades K-5) opened on September 28, 2009. Additions and remodeling were also made to the Lake Bluff Middle School (grades 6-8). At the Middle School part of the original "Lake Bluff School" is now on display. East School held its final classes through September 2009. Lake Bluff Middle School was renovated in 2016 with two new classroom wings, a new library, cafeteria, and a Makerspace.

Public schools
 Lake Bluff Elementary School (Kindergarten through 5th grade)
 Lake Bluff Middle School (6th grade through 8th grade)
 Lake Bluff high school students attend Lake Forest High School in Lake Forest.

Private school
 Forest Bluff School (Montessori; Ages 18 months through 8th grade)

Defunct
 Lake Bluff West Elementary School (closed in 1994, now serves as rental office space)
 Lake Bluff Central Elementary School (closed and demolished in 2008)
 Lake Bluff East Elementary School (closed in 2009, demolished in 2010)

Arts and culture
The Lake Bluff History Museum provides a place to learn about Lake Bluff's past. Their mission is to keep Lake Bluff history alive by researching and preserving historical information, creating interest in and sharing knowledge of local history, inspiring broad participation in events supporting this mission and embodying the spirit and pride characteristic of Lake Bluff. The museum sponsors a variety of programs and fundraisers that support its mission. Every alternating year the Lake Bluff History Museum organizes a "Ghost Walk" around Halloween to celebrate their haunted history. This includes group tours of the town led by residents dressed as ghouls who tell stories about creepy occurrences in the past.

Every year there are many cultural events on the Village Green including a Veterans Day flag raising ceremony, Gazebo lighting (Christmas), and a farmers' market every Friday in the summer. During the summer of 2017 a local coffee shop began hosting "Pizza Nights" on Friday evenings.

Every summer Lake Bluff is the host of the Bluffinia concerts on the village green. Bands from all over the United States come downtown to rock out. Music styles range from 1920s Classical, to 1950s Rock N' Roll, to 1980s Pop music. Residents listen to the music on the village green, eat food from local restaurants on Scranton Avenue, and drink in bars like the Mavery Public House and the Inovasi casual. The Bluffinia concert is the second most attended and noted concert series in Lake County, Illinois behind the Ravinia Festival. 

Each year Lake Bluff organizes a notable parade on Independence Day sponsored by the Lake Bluff July 4 Committee with assistance from American Legion Post 510. The parade features many organizations and entertainers, including a performance by synchronized lawnmower, the local Boy Scout Troop, and various other associations from around the North Shore.

Cultural references

 Ray Bradbury's short story The Lake (1944) is set in Lake Bluff.
 The 1978 film A Wedding was filmed in Lake Bluff, near the border between Lake Bluff and the Great Lakes Naval Facility.
 The 1980 film Ordinary People was filmed mostly in neighboring Lake Forest and nearby Fort Sheridan and Highland Park, although some scenes were filmed in Lake Bluff.
 The 1998 film Kissing a Fool used Lake Bluff's bluff as a backdrop for the film's wedding scenes. 
 The 2001 film New Port South, written by James Hughes, son of Chicago-area filmmaker John Hughes, used Lake Bluff for its traditional suburban look.

Notable people 

 Andrew Bird, musician
William M. Blair, financier, founder of William Blair & Company
Henry Williams Blodgett, Judge of the United States District Court for the Northern District of Illinois
John H. Bryan, CEO of Sara Lee Corporation, owner of Crab Tree Farm, creator of Millennium Park in Chicago
 Bay Darnell,  stock car racing driver and builder
Jacob Doyle, professional baseball player in the first season of Major League Baseball
 Grace Durand, owner of Crab Tree Farm, activist, and prominent socialite
Charlie Finn, actor
Gary Groh, PGA Tour professional golfer
Alice Corbin Henderson, poet and author
William Penhallow Henderson, painter and architect 
Ken Henry (speed skater), Olympic gold medalist speed skater & coach
 David Jenkins, television writer and producer
 Thomas F. Lachner, businessman and politician
Wally Lemm, head football coach for Lake Forest College, Houston Oilers, and St. Louis Cardinals (NFL)
 Richard Marx, singer-songwriter
Robert McClory, member of the United States House of Representatives, village attorney, and Boy Scout leader
Mark Morettini, actor
 Matt Nagy, head coach of the Chicago Bears
 Ryan Pace, general manager of the Chicago Bears 
 David Pasquesi, actor
 John Paxson, former point guard and general manager of the Chicago Bulls
 Rob Pelinka, general manager of NBA's Los Angeles Lakers, former University of Michigan player and agent for Kobe Bryant
 Tommy Rees, quarterback and offensive coordinator at Notre Dame
 Cynthia Rhodes, dancer and actress
Hadley Richardson, first wife of Ernest Hemingway
Robert Rockwell, actor
 Phil Rosenthal (columnist), columnist for the Chicago Tribune
 Ryne Sandberg, former Chicago Cubs infielder and manager of the Philadelphia Phillies 
Richard Warren Sears, founder of Sears, Roebuck & Company
 Martha Sleeper, silent film and Broadway actress
Barbara Trentham, actress
Edgar Uihlein, founder of General Binding Corporation, heir of the Joseph Schlitz Brewing Company
 Casey Urlacher, brother of Brian Urlacher and Arena Football League player
William Vanderkloot, pilot of Winston Churchill
 Fred Wacker, Formula One driver, socialite, musician, and businessman 
Leslie Wildman, composer

References

External links
Village of Lake Bluff
 

 
Chicago metropolitan area
Villages in Lake County, Illinois
Villages in Illinois
Populated places established in 1836
1836 establishments in Illinois